Lynn Alvarez (born September 6, 1985) is an American mixed martial artist. She competes in the strawweight division for Invicta FC and has competed for Bellator.

Mixed martial arts record

|-
| Loss
| align=center| 6–5
| JJ Aldrich
| Decision (unanimous)
| Invicta FC 20: Evinger vs. Kunitskaya
| 
| align=center|3
| align=center|5:00
| Kansas City, Missouri
|
|-
| Loss
| align=center| 6–4
| Mizuki Inoue
| Submission (armbar)
| Invicta FC 18: Grasso vs. Esquibel
| 
| align=center|2
| align=center|3:00
| Kansas City, Missouri
|
|-
| Win
| align=center| 6–3
| Amber Stautzenberger
| Submission (rear-naked choke)
| Dakota FC: Winter Brawl 2014
| 
| align=center|1
| align=center|0:45
| Fargo, North Dakota
|
|-
| Loss
| align=center| 5–3
| Carla Esparza
| TKO (strikes)
| Invicta FC 3: Penne vs. Sugiyama
| 
| align=center|1
| align=center|2:53
| Kansas City, Kansas
|
|-
| Loss
| align=center| 5–2
| Jessica Aguilar
| Submission (arm-triangle choke)
| Bellator 24
| 
| align=center|1
| align=center|4:01
| Hollywood, Florida
|
|-
| Win
| align=center| 5–1
| Shoni Esquiro
| Submission (armbar)
| Freestyle Cage Fighting 34
| 
| align=center|1
| align=center|2:43
| Shawnee, Oklahoma
|
|-
| Win
| align=center| 4–1
| Chelsea Colarelli
| Submission (armbar)
| Shark Fights 1
| 
| align=center|1
| align=center|1:56
| Amarillo, Texas
|
|-
| Win
| align=center| 3–1
| Stephanie Bobo
| TKO (punches)
| Freestyle Cage Fighting 22
| 
| align=center|1
| align=center|
| Shawnee, Oklahoma
|
|-
| Win
| align=center| 2–1
| Michelle Ould
| Submission (choke)
| Valor Fighting: Fight Night
| 
| align=center|3
| align=center|1:33
| Tustin, California
|
|-
| Loss
| align=center| 1–1
| Angela Magaña
| Submission (armbar)
| Tuff-N-Uff
| 
| align=center|2
| align=center|1:25
| Las Vegas, Nevada
|
|-
| Win
| align=center| 1–0
| Michelle Waterson
| Submission (guillotine choke)
| Ring of Fire 31: Undisputed
| 
| align=center|1
| align=center|1:19
| Broomfield, Colorado
|
|-

References

1985 births
Living people
Mixed martial artists from Nevada
Sportspeople from Las Vegas
American female mixed martial artists
Strawweight mixed martial artists
21st-century American women